Otto Martwig (24 February 1903 – May 1945) was a German footballer who played for Union Oberschöneweide, Tennis Borussia Berlin and the Germany national team.

References

1903 births
1945 deaths
Association football midfielders
German footballers
footballers from Berlin
Germany international footballers
Tennis Borussia Berlin players